Jamiu Bolaji "BJ" Ojulari (born April 5, 2002) is an American football defensive end for the LSU Tigers. He is the younger brother of NFL player Azeez Ojulari.

Early life and high school
Ojulari grew up in Marietta, Georgia, and attended Marietta High School. As a senior, he set a school record with 19 sacks and was named the Area Defensive Player of the Year with Marietta Daily Journal. Ojulari initially committed to play college football at Tennessee, but flipped his commitment to LSU during senior season.

College career
Ojulari played in all ten of LSU's games as a freshman and finished the season with 16 tackles, four sacks, and five tackles for loss with a forced fumble and a fumble recovery and was named to the Southeastern Conference (SEC) All-Freshman team. He was named the SEC Defensive Lineman of the Week after sacking South Carolina quarterback Collin Hill three times for a loss of 21 yards. Ojulari was named the conference Defensive Lineman of the Week a second time after a 2½ sack performance in a 49-21 win over Central Michigan in the third week of his sophomore season.

Personal life
Ojulari's parents immigrated to the United States from Nigeria and his maternal grandfather was the Yoruban artist Twins Seven Seven. His older brother, Azeez Ojulari, played college football for the Georgia Bulldogs before being drafted by the New York Giants in the second round of the 2021 NFL Draft.

References

External links 
 LSU Tigers bio

2002 births
Living people
American football defensive ends
Players of American football from Georgia (U.S. state)
LSU Tigers football players
American sportspeople of Nigerian descent
American people of Yoruba descent
Yoruba sportspeople